Wethenoc or Gwethenoc or Guethenoc was a 5th-century Breton saint.

Life
A son of Prince Fragan of Dumnonia and Saint Gwen the Three-Breasted, he grew up at Ploufragan near Saint-Brieuc (in northwestern France) with his brothers, Winwaloe and Jacut. They were later joined by a sister, Creirwy. He was educated by Budoc of Dol on the Île Lavret near Paimpol.

References

Medieval Welsh saints
5th-century Christian saints
5th-century births
Year of birth unknown
Year of death unknown